The Edgar Allan Poe Awards (popularly called the Edgars), named after Edgar Allan Poe, are presented every year by the Mystery Writers of America. They remain the most prestigious awards in the entire mystery genre. Since 1961 they have presented an award in the category of Best Juvenile Mystery Fiction.

Winners

1960s

1970s

1980s

1990s

2000s

2010s

2020s

See also 
 Edgar Award
 Mystery Writers of America
 :Category:Edgar Award winners
 :Category:Edgar Award winning works

References

External links
 The official website of Edgar Awards

Lists of writers by award
Mystery and detective fiction awards
English-language literary awards